Ernest George Miller (born 17 October 1927) is a former South African footballer who played as an inside forward.

Football career
Playing for Arcadia Shepherds in his native South Africa, Miller signed for Leeds United in November 1950 on the recommendation of a friend of Leeds manager Frank Buckley. Several South African players later followed Miller to Leeds, including Ken Hastie and Gordon Stewart. Over the course of just over a calendar year, Miller made 13 Football League for Leeds, scoring once. In March 1952, Miller signed for Workington. Miller made 11 appearances at the club, before returning to South Africa. Miller scored twice in three appearances for South Africa during his career.

Baseball
Miller also represented South Africa in baseball, playing against an Amateur USA team in 1955 and 1956.

References

1927 births
Possibly living people
South African soccer players
White South African people
Soccer players from Pretoria
South African expatriate soccer players
Expatriate footballers in England
South African expatriate sportspeople in England
South Africa international soccer players
Association football forwards
Arcadia Shepherds F.C. players
Leeds United F.C. players
Workington A.F.C. players
English Football League players